Walter Stewart (-1575), 3rd Laird of Baldorran, 2nd Bailie of Balquhidder, was a sixteenth-century Scottish landowner, and the ancestor of the Ardvorlich, Annat, and Glenfinglas Stewarts.

Early life

Walter Stewart was born about 1480 in Baldorran, Campsie, Stirlingshire, the third son of William Stewart, 2nd Laird Of Baldorran.  His mother was Marion Helen Campbell of Glenorchy.

Walter's father William Stewart of Baldorran was the founder of the Balquhidder Stewart clan.

Bailie of the Crown Lands of Balquhidder
Walter succeeded his father as Royal Baillie of Balquhidder. He was confirmed in the ownership of his ancestral lands in September 1500 from his father Sir William Stewart.

Family
Walter married Euphemia Reideugh (aka "Ruddock"), daughter of James Reideugh of Cultobraggan, comptroller of the household of King James IV. They had two children:
 James Stewart, born about 1510 in Campsie, married a daughter of Patrick Stewart of Glenbucky.
 Helen Stewart, born about 1515 in Perthshire, married John Dog.

References
Debrett, John, p.748, The Peerage of the United Kingdom of Great Britain & Ireland, Volume 2 Retrieved October 2012
Nelker, Gladys P, The Clan Steuart (1970).

Citations

External links
Stewart at wc.rootsweb.ancestry.com Retrieved October 2012
lillymcgrew.org Retrieved October 2012

1575 deaths
Scottish landowners
Walter
1480 births in Scotland
1480 births